Aminata Mbengue Ndiaye is a Senegalese politician. In 2012, she was appointed Minister of Livestock and Animal Production in the government of Prime Minister Abdou Mbaye and from 2014 under the government of Prime Minister Mahammad Boun Abdallah Dionne until 5 April 2019, when she was named Minister of Fishery and Maritime Economy Ministre des Pêches et de l’Economie maritime. She also serves as mayor of Louga, and is currently chair of the women's movement of the Socialist Party of Senegal. Previously, Ndiaye served as Minister of Women, Children and the Family, as well as Minister of Social Development and National Solidarity under the presidency of Abdou Diouf.

Ndiaye is a member of the Pan-African Parliament.

Biography
Born to El Hadj Ali Mbengue, a civil servant, in Louga, Senegal. Attended Lycée Ahmed Fall in Saint-Louis and later Lycée Kennedy before École normale d'enseignement technique and École national d’économie appliqué (ENEA). Member of the Senegalese national basketball team at the Second All African Games in Lagos, Nigeria in 1973.

References

Bibliography
 "Aminata Mbengue Ndiaye", in The HerStory Project: Volume 1, edited by Anthonia Makwemoisa Amalion, Dakar, 2011, page 211–217.
 "Aminata Mbengue Ndiaye : La 'gardienne du temple' socialiste", in Femmes au Sénégal, Les Cahiers de l'Alternance (Dakar), Konrad Adenauer Foundation and Centre d'études des sciences et techniques de l'information (CESTI), issue 10, December 2006, page 91. (in French)

Year of birth missing (living people)
Living people
Socialist Party of Senegal politicians
Government ministers of Senegal
Family ministers of Senegal
Fisheries ministers of Senegal
Women's ministers of Senegal
Members of the Pan-African Parliament from Senegal
21st-century Senegalese women politicians
21st-century Senegalese politicians
Women mayors of places in Senegal
Mayors of places in Senegal
Women government ministers of Senegal
Women members of the Pan-African Parliament